Simone Farelli (born 19 February 1983) is an Italian footballer who plays as a goalkeeper.

Club career

Early career
Born in Rome, Farelli began his senior career at hometown Serie D club Astrea.

Siena
In mid-2002 he was signed by Siena. At that time Siena was a Serie B club. In 2003, he followed the team to promote to Serie A. In mid-2004 he left for Serie C2 club Nocerina, but in January 2005 returned to the city of Siena.

Farelli returned to Italian fourth level in 2005–06 season, for Vittoria. Then he left for Serie C1 club Ancona and then Lanciano. In February 2007 he received a call-up to Italy Universiade team for a training match. In that match he was a substitute.

Crotone 
Farelli settled in Crotone in 2008–09 season, the first club that he spent more than 1 season. The team won the first ever promotion playoffs to the third level since 2008, the year that the level was renamed to Lega Pro Prima Divisione. He was the backup keeper of Emanuele Concetti in his two-year stay.

Siena (second spell)
In 2010–11 Serie B, Crotone signed Vid Belec and Giacomo Bindi, and Farelli was allowed to leave for Siena in 1+1 year deal. Siena was newly relegated from Serie A at that time.

He was the third keeper of Siena, behind Ferdinando Coppola and Gianluca Pegolo. Despite Coppola was replaced by Željko Brkić in 2011–12 season. Siena won promotion at the end of 2010–11 Serie B.

Latina
In July 2014 Farelli and former Siena teammate Francesco Valiani were signed by Latina on free transfers.

Trapani
On 11 July 2016 Farelli was signed by Trapani on a 2-year contract. On 30 January 2017 Farelli was loaned to Arezzo.

Novara
On 25 July 2017 Farelli was transferred to Novara, with Francesco Pacini moved to opposite direction on a temporary deal.

Pescara
On 4 September 2018 Pescara signed Farelli on a free transfer. He was assigned number 21 shirt.

References

External links
 
 Football.it Profile  
 2015–16 profile by La Gazzetta dello Sport 
 

Italian footballers
Serie B players
Serie C players
A.C.N. Siena 1904 players
A.S.G. Nocerina players
A.C. Ancona players
S.S. Virtus Lanciano 1924 players
F.C. Crotone players
F.C. Vittoria players
Latina Calcio 1932 players
Trapani Calcio players
S.S. Arezzo players
Novara F.C. players
Delfino Pescara 1936 players
A.S. Roma players
Association football goalkeepers
Footballers from Rome
1983 births
Living people